William Capps (occasionally spelled Capp or Cappes) was born in Norfolk, England in or around 1575.  William married Catherine Jernagin (also spelt Katheryn Jermingham) in Norwich, Norfolk, England, 11-Dec-1596, at St. Michael at Plea. He and his wife had five children together: Henry, Frances, Willoughby, Anne, and William.

Arrival Virginia 

He traveled to the Colony of Virginia aboard the Sea Venture and was apparently among those shipwrecked in Bermuda for several months before reaching the New World.  William Capps arrived in Virginia in 1609-1610 and settled at Kecoughtan on the west side of the Hampton River. This site is in present-day Hampton, Virginia and is on the opposite side of the Hampton River from the grounds of Hampton Institute. There is a street called "Capps Quarters" in this area that is almost certainly part of William Capps' original tract of land.  A Virginia historical marker is posted in this area. This point, patented by William Capps about 1634, was known for a century as Capps Point. The area was later renamed Little England.

Kecoughtan had originally been the site of an Indian village which on May 1, 1607 had some 18 houses of twigs and bark and 20 fighting men. Indians and whites had lived together at this site for the first years of the Colony, but in summer 1610 Sir Thomas Gates drove the Kecoughtan Indians from the area in retaliation of the killing of a settler at Fort Algernourne (Old Point Comfort). The settlement grew slowly as a report of John Rolfe in 1616 shows: "At Keqoughtan, being not farr from the mouth of the river, thirty-seven miles below James Towne on the same side, are twenty [persons] whereof eleven are Farmors."

Ancient Planter 

In May-1616 only 350 of all persons who had come to Virginia remained there - the rest having died or given up and returned to England. Three years later in 1619 the first general division of land in Virginia occurred. John Rolfe described the situation in Jan-1620 in glowing terms: "All the ancient planters being sett free have chosen places for their dividendes according to the commission, Which giveth all greate content, for knowing their owne landes, they strive and are prepared to build houses & cleere their groundes ready to plant, which giveth ... [them] greate incouragement, and the greatest hope to make the Colony florrish that ever yet happened to them."

First House of Burgesses 

That same year as the land division, the Colony's Governor issued a call for the first representative legislative assembly in America which convened at Jamestown on July 30, 1619 and remained in session until August 4, 1619. Twenty-two Burgesses met representing the 11 major settlements in Virginia. The Kecoughtan settlement was represented by Capt William Tucker and William Capps. A memorial church built on the foundations of the church in which the House of Burgesses met exists at the Historic Jamestowne National Park Service site on Jamestown Island, Virginia. A monument bearing the names of the Burgesses is located near within the confines of the newly rediscovered original Jamestown fort.

It was apparently at their urging that the first House of Burgesses was asked "to change the savage name of Kiccowtan, and to give that Incorporation a new name." The new name selected was Elizabeth City after the daughter of King James. In Dec-1619 the population of Virginia was about 900 out of a total immigration of 1440.

Member Virginia Council 

In 1627, William Capps was appointed a member of the Council by the Crown upon the recommendation of the Governor. The Councilors were the Governor's advisers in executive matters and constituted the supreme court of the Virginia. They also held legislative functions as members of the upper house of the Virginia Assembly, corresponding somewhat to our senate.  Two years later William Capps asked leave of the Governor to depart the colony on the King's affairs, and when permission was refused, departed any way. In 1630 he returned with the King's letter of instructions to the Council.  The date of his death was →1637 which was 8 years after the passing of his Wife Catherine.←

References 

1570s births
17th-century deaths
Year of death unknown
Virginia colonial people
House of Burgesses members